Sol Saks (December 13, 1910 – April 16, 2011) was an American screenwriter best known as the creator of the television sitcom Bewitched.

Life and career

Saks was born in New York City to Jewish parents. He attended Harrison High School in Chicago.

He was a radio actor as a child. He later wrote for radio and TV series such as My Favorite Husband, Mr. Adams and Eve, and I Married Joan.

Saks wrote the screenplay for Cary Grant's last film, the comedy Walk, Don't Run.<ref name="bbc">Bewitched creator Sol Saks dies aged 100 from BBC News</ref> At the time of its release, Time said his dialogue on that film "bristles amiably from first to last."

He wrote The Craft of Comedy Writing'', published by Writer's Digest Books.

Death
Saks died of respiratory failure due to pneumonia on April 16, 2011, at the age of 100, in Los Angeles, California.

He was survived by his wife Sandra, daughter Mary Spivey, son Daniel Saks, two granddaughters and two great-grandsons.

References

External links
Extensive video interview with Saks from May 2009, from the Academy of Television Arts & Sciences

1910 births
2011 deaths
American male radio actors
Television producers from New York City
American male screenwriters
American comedy writers
Deaths from pneumonia in California
Deaths from respiratory failure
Writers from New York City
Male actors from Chicago
American centenarians
American male child actors
Jewish American male actors
Bewitched
Screenwriters from New York (state)
Screenwriters from Illinois
Television producers from Illinois
Men centenarians
21st-century American Jews